Al Rayan Bank PLC (لمصرف الريان formerly known as Islamic Bank of Britain) is a commercial bank in the United Kingdom, established in August 2004 to offer Sharia compliant financial service products to customers of any faith. The bank has one Premier branch in Knightsbridge in London.

The bank welcomes people of all faiths and has become popular with many non-Muslims looking for an ethical alternative to conventional banks.

The bank has a Sharia department and an independent Sharia Supervisory Committee to ensure that its products are compliant with the principles of Islamic finance.

As of 2020, Al Rayan Bank has serviced 80,000 customers.

History
Islamic Bank of Britain was formed by a group of investors from the Middle East to take advantage of the growing market for Sharia compliant financial services in the UK. In July 2002, consultants and advisors were employed to confirm if such type of bank was needed and if it would be accepted by the Financial Services Authority, FSA.

Potential investors were invited, mainly from the Persian Gulf, who put together a private placement document which allowed the company to raise £14 million in start up capital by early 2003. In the same period, its first managing director, Michael Hanlon was recruited. Later that year, a draft business plan was proposed and formal application to the FSA was submitted.

By August 2004, the FSA granted authorisation of the bank, and subsequently led to the Islamic Bank of Britain becoming available to the public.

Giles Cunningham is the current CEO of Al Rayan Bank; he joined the Bank in April 2021.

Macroeconomic conditions
Like all financial institutions, the Bank was adversely affected firstly by the global financial crisis of 2007–2008 and subsequently by on-going weak macroeconomic conditions. Despite, this IBB continued to grow and in 2012 attained the highest level of retail asset finance and deposit balances in its history.

The acquisition of Islamic Bank of Britain by Masraf Al Rayan
On 16 January 2014, IBB confirmed that its new parent company was Masraf Al Rayan, one of the largest Islamic banks in the world.

In December 2014, Islamic Bank of Britain officially changed its name to Al Rayan Bank PLC, to reflect its status as part of the Masraf Al Rayan (MAR) group of companies.

Billion pound bank
In December 2016, Al Rayan Bank announced that the value of its retail and commercial asset book had passed the £1 billion mark for the first time.

Rapid growth
In 2016, the Al Rayan Bank was named as the third fastest growing bank in the UK by 'Bank League Tables 2017', a complete financial analysis of all 155 UK incorporated banks, published by Searchline Publishing.  This was followed in 2017 by the Bank posting record pre-tax profits of £8.2m and announcing that it had over 77,000 customers.

Al Rayan Bank became the only UK Islamic bank to receive an official rating when global credit agency Moody's assigned a Aa3 deposit rating to Al Rayan Bank in November 2017.  Later that month the Bank's previous CEO, Sultan Choudhury was appointed an OBE for his services to Islamic finance by His Royal Highness Prince William, Duke of Cambridge.

Change of strategy
In 2022 the Bank announced that it intended to become a financial institution which is focused on premier banking and property, mainly high value residential investments, to deliver a viable, resilient, Sharia compliant business. Al Rayan Bank said its existing retail banking business will be maintained, but will not be the primary focus in the future.

References

External links

 Al Rayan Bank 2017 Annual Report
 Al Rayan Bank website
 Q & A Islamic Finance (BBC)

2004 establishments in the United Kingdom
Banks established in 2004
Banks of the United Kingdom
Islam in the United Kingdom
Islamic banks